The San religion is the traditional religion and mythology of the San people. It is poorly attested due to their interactions with Christianity.

Gods and mythical figures 
ǀXam
The ǀXam prayed to the Sun and Moon. Many myths are ascribed to various stars.
 ǀKágge̥n (sometimes corrupted to "Cagn") is Mantis, a demiurge and hero in ǀXam folklore. He is a trickster god who can shape-shift. He and his wife ǀHúnntuǃattǃatte̥n. 
 ǀHúnntuǃattǃatte̥n (also known as or corrupted to "Coti"), the Dassie, adopted !Xo, Porcupine, as their daughter.
 !Xo,  Porcupine, as their parents ǀKágge̥n and ǀHúnntuǃattǃatte̥n, married  Ichneumon, son was the Ichneumon.
 /Kwammang-a, a dangerous stranger carnivore,  married !Xo, son was the Ichneumon.
 Ichneumon,  a small, furry carnivore, mongoose.
 ǂKá̦gára and ǃHãunu are brothers-in-law who fought with lightning, causing massive storms in the east.

Other
ǃXu is the Khoikhoi word ǃKhub 'rich man, master', which was used by some Christian missionaries to translate "Lord" in the Bible, and repeated by San people in reporting what the Khoikhoi told them. It is used in Juǀʼhoan as the word for the Christian god. It has been misinterpreted as the "Bushman creator".

Trance 

To enter the spirit world, trance has to be initiated by a shaman through the hunting of a tutelary spirit or power animal. The eland often serves as power animal. The fat of the eland is used symbolically in many rituals including initiations and rites of passage. Other animals such as giraffe, kudu and hartebeest can also serve this function.

One of the most important rituals in the San religion is the great dance, or the trance dance. This dance typically takes a circular form, with women clapping and singing and men dancing rhythmically. Although there is no evidence that the Kalahari San use hallucinogens regularly, student shaman may use hallucinogens to go into trance for the first time.

Psychologists have investigated hallucinations and altered states of consciousness in neuropsychology. They found that entoptic phenomena can occur through rhythmic dancing, music, sensory deprivation, hyperventilation, prolonged and intense concentration and migraines. The psychological approach explains rock art through three trance phases. In the first phase of trance an altered state of consciousness would come about. People would experience geometric shapes commonly known as entoptic phenomena. These would include zigzags, chevrons, dots, flecks, grids, vortices and U-shapes. These shapes can be found especially in rock engravings of Southern Africa.

During the second phase of trance people try to make sense of the entoptic phenomena. They would elaborate the shape they had 'seen' until they had created something that looked familiar to them. Shamans experiencing the second phase of trance would incorporate the natural world into their entoptic phenomena, visualizing honeycombs or other familiar shapes.

In the third phase a radical transformation occurs in mental imagery. The most noticeable change is that the shaman becomes part of the experience. Subjects under laboratory conditions have found that they experience sliding down a rotating tunnel, entering caves or holes in the ground. People in the third phase begin to lose their grip on reality and hallucinate monsters and animals of strong emotional content. In this phase, therianthropes in rock painting can be explained as heightened sensory awareness that gives one the feeling that they have undergone a physical transformation.

A San trance dance featuring the San of Ghanzi, Botswana appeared in BBC Television's Around the World in 80 Faiths on 16 January 2009.

Rock art 

Pictographs can be found across Southern Africa in places such as the cave sandstone of KwaZulu-Natal, Free State and North-Eastern Cape, the granite and Waterberg sandstone of the Northern Transvaal, the Table Mountain sandstone of the Southern and Western Cape. Images of conflict and war-making are not uncommon. There are also often images of therianthrophic entities which have both human and animal traits and are connected to the notion of trancing, but these represent only a fraction of all rock art representations. Most commonly portrayed are animals such as the eland, although grey rhebok and hartebeest are also in rock art in places such as Cederberg and Warm Bokkeveld. At uKhahlamba / Drakensberg Park there are paintings thought to be some 3,000 years old which depict humans and animals, and are thought to have religious significance.

See also 

229762 Gǃkúnǁʼhòmdímà and 469705 ǂKá̦gára, trans-Neptunian objects named after San mythological figures

References

Sources 
 
 
 
 
 
 
 
Heinz, H-J. 1975. Elements of !Ko Bushmen religious beliefs. Anthropos 70:17–41.
 
 
 
 
 
 
 
Lewis-Williams, David (2004). San Spirituality Roots, Expressions & Social Consequences. Double Storey. 
Marshall, L. 1999. Nyae Nyae !Kung. Cambridge (Massachusetts): Peabody Museum Monographs (Number 8), Harvard University.

External links 
 
World Digital Library presentation of 3008 Rock Painting S00568, Bethlehem, Dihlabeng District Municipality, Free State . University of Pretoria.

Traditional African religions
Religion in Botswana
Religion in South Africa
San people